Project Hurunui is a proposed wind farm located between Omihi and Greta Valley in north Canterbury, New Zealand. Meridian Energy is developing the wind farm, which is planned to produce up to 75.9 MW from 2014.

The proposal is for a wind farm of 33 turbines, with maximum height of 130.5 metres, located on a 34 km² area on the east side of State Highway 1.

Consent process 
Meridian Energy began consultations on the project in April 2010. An informal survey of residents in the affected area showed that slightly more were in favour of the wind farm than those who were opposed.

The application for consents was lodged in February 2011, and notified in April 2011.  In June 2011, the Hurunui District Council and the Canterbury Regional Council agreed to a request by Meridian that the wind farm proposal be referred to the Environment Court. Consent was granted by the Environment Court in April 2013.

In February 2021 Meridian said that the company wanted to see more demand in the South Island before developing more generation there.

See also 

Wind power in New Zealand

References

External links 
Project Hurunui at Meridian Energy

Proposed wind farms in New Zealand
Canterbury, New Zealand